B. E. Taylor Christmas is the debut solo album by B. E. Taylor. The album was released in 1994, and was the first in a two-album series of Christmas albums by B.E.

Track listing
"Joy to the World" - 5:11
"What Child Is This?" - 4:56
"We Three Kings" - 4:39
"O Come All Ye Faithful/Emanuel" - 4:11
"Mary's Boy Child" - 3:58
"Little Drummer Boy" - 3:56
"O Holy Night" - 4:32
"O Little Town of Bethlehem" - 4:06
"Angels We Have Heard On High" - 5:52
"Midnight Clear" - 3:39
"God Rest Ye Merry Gentlemen" - 4:21
"Silent Night" - 4:16

B. E. Taylor albums
1994 debut albums
1994 Christmas albums
Christmas albums by American artists
Pop rock Christmas albums